Jean Lee Yip  (born  1968) is a Chinese Canadian politician born in Scarborough, Ontario, who was elected to the House of Commons in a by-election on December 11, 2017. She represents the electoral district of Scarborough—Agincourt as a member of the Liberal Party of Canada caucus.

Yip is the widow of her predecessor Arnold Chan, and first became prominent in the riding when she took time to assist her husband with constituency political duties during his cancer treatment.

Election results

References

External links
 

Living people
Liberal Party of Canada MPs
Members of the House of Commons of Canada from Ontario
People from Scarborough, Toronto
People from Willowdale, Toronto
Politicians from Toronto
21st-century Canadian politicians
Women members of the House of Commons of Canada
Women in Ontario politics
1968 births
Canadian politicians of Chinese descent
21st-century Canadian women politicians